HowTo.tv was a video website that hosted instructional, brand-sponsored, videos on how to accomplish certain tasks, such as how to tie a tie or how to apply makeup. Users were able to view the videos directly on the website or download them to their mobile phone or iPod.

Background
HowTo.tv founders argue that instructional videos are a more efficient way to reach to customers than traditional advertising. 

Thus, founder Howard Kosky told The Guardian, "the only people we would expect to go and view how to repair a bicycle puncture will be those people who have a bicycle and have a puncture, for a company like Halfords that's a very, very highly indexed pound as invested as there's zero wastage."

Affiliations
L'Oréal, Wilkinson Sword, RWE npower, among others showcased their videos on HowTo.tv.

The company also conducted marketing research.

References

How-to websites
Defunct British websites
Internet properties established in 2007